The American Cricketer was the publication of record for the club, cricket in the United States for more than half a century. The slim magazine was first published in Philadelphia in 1877 and continued to see the print through 1929, a total of 52 years. It was published weekly over the summer cricketing season, and monthly over winter. George Newhall of the Newhall cricketing family of Philadelphia was one of its editors.

See also
 Young America Cricket Club

References

External links
 The American Cricketer, Volumes 38-39, (1915-1916).

Defunct cricket magazines
Sports magazines published in the United States
Cricket in the United States
Magazines established in 1877
Magazines disestablished in 1929
1877 establishments in Pennsylvania
1929 disestablishments in Pennsylvania
Magazines published in Philadelphia
Defunct magazines published in the United States
Weekly magazines published in the United States
Monthly magazines published in the United States